Polyphasia may refer to:
 Cognitive polyphasia
 Polyphasia, a taxonomic synonym for the moth genus Dysstroma

See also 
 Polyphase (disambiguation)